Gaetano Gandolfi (31 August 1734 – 20 June 1802) was an Italian painter of the late Baroque and early Neoclassic period, active in Bologna.

Career 
Gaetano was born in San Matteo della Decima, near Bologna, to a family of artists.  Ubaldo Gandolfi was his brother, Mauro Gandolfi was his son, and Democrito Gandolfi was his grandson. Gaetano became a "student" at the Accademia Clementina in Bologna, where he was taught by Felice Torelli and Ercole Lelli. In the academy, he was the recipient of several prizes for both figure drawing and sculpture. Later, in an autobiography, Gaetano claimed Felice Torelli (1667–1748) as his master. Other sources mention Ercole Graziani the Younger (1688–1765) and Ercole Lelli. He traveled to England, and became strongly influenced by Tiepolo. Among his pupils was Serafino Viani from Reggio. Gaetano died in Bologna, Italy.

Collections 
Today, Gaetano's work is held in the permanent collections of several museums worldwide, including the Cooper Hewitt, the Detroit Institute of Arts, the Norton Museum of Art, the Snite Museum of Art, the University of Michigan Museum of Art, the British Museum, the LACMA, the Museum of Fine Arts, Budapest, the Toledo Museum of Art, and the Victoria and Albert Museum.

Gallery

References

 Biagi Maino, Donatella, Gaetano Gandolfi / Donatella Biagi Maino, Torino, U. Allemandi, 1995.
 Cazort, Mimi, Bella Pittura: The Art of the Gandolfi, Ottawa, National Gallery of Canada, 1993.
 Cazort, Mimi, The Art of Embellishment: Drawings and Paintings by Gaetano and Mauro Gandolfi for a Festive Carriage, in Record of The Art Museum, Princeton University, Volume 52, Number 2, 1993.
 Rosasco, Betsy, Drawings by the Gandolfi Family and Their Followers in The Art Museum: A Checklist, in Record of The Art Museum, Princeton University, Volume 52, Number 2, 1993.
 Vicenza, Neri Pozza, I Gandolfi: Ubaldo, Gaetano, Mauro, disegni e dipinti, Neri Pozza Editore, 1987.

External links
 
Europe in the age of enlightenment and revolution, a catalog from The Metropolitan Museum of Art Libraries (fully available online as PDF), which contains material on Gandolfi (see index)
 Gaetano Gandolfi in ArtCyclopedia

1734 births
1802 deaths
18th-century Italian painters
Italian male painters
19th-century Italian painters
19th-century Italian male artists
Painters from Bologna
Italian Baroque painters
Rococo painters
18th-century Italian male artists